American Presidents: Life Portraits is a series produced by C-SPAN in 1999. Each episode was aired live, and was a two- to three-hour look at the life and times of one particular president of the United States. Episodes were broadcast from locations of importance to the profiled president, featured interviews with historians and other experts, and incorporated calls from viewers. The series served as a commemoration of C-SPAN's 20th anniversary.

The first program aired on March 15, 1999, and profiled George Washington. Subsequent programs featured each president in succession, concluding with Bill Clinton on December 20, 1999. (Despite serving two non-consecutive terms, Grover Cleveland was only profiled on one program.)

Peabody Award
American Presidents was awarded a George Foster Peabody Award in 1999. Excerpts of the official rationale for that award appear below:

...From the sites, noted biographers, presidential scholars, descendants, and other guests presented revealing information and assessments of the life, times and legacies of the presidents. The tone set by chairman and CEO (and reluctant air personality) Brian P. Lamb remains on point: good television often takes time, requires few special effects and demands (and rewards) good listening...

...For creating a series that perfectly embodies the essence of public service in electronic communications, a Peabody Award is presented to C-SPAN for "American Presidents: Life Portraits."

Presidential portraits
Artist Chas Fagan was commissioned by C-SPAN to paint portraits of each of the 41 men who had held the office of U.S. president through 1999. He was given a 90-day window from the time he agreed to the assignment until the time that the project needed to be complete. In September 1999, Union Station in Washington, D.C., hosted a display of Fagan's presidential portraits. Since then, Fagan has also painted portraits of George W. Bush, Barack Obama, and Donald Trump, and tours with exhibits of those portraits.

Programs
Note: In addition to the interviewees listed, each program featured a variety of other experts, many of whom were employed by or volunteered for the historical sites from which the programs were being broadcast.

References

External links

C-SPAN original programming
Television series about presidents of the United States
1999 American television series debuts
1999 American television series endings
Peabody Award-winning television programs
American television talk shows